Daniel Crossan Kelly (1893 – 11 January 1948) was a Scottish footballer who played mainly as a centre forward for Hamilton Academical, Clyde and Motherwell. He was Hamilton's leading goalscorer for most of the World War I period (the Scottish Football League continued to operate during the conflict). He later played for Bathgate and Bo'ness who at that time were members of the Central Football League outwith the SFL.

References

1893 births
Date of birth missing
Footballers from Motherwell
1948 deaths
Scottish footballers
Association football forwards
Hamilton Academical F.C. players
Motherwell F.C. players
Clyde F.C. players
Bo'ness F.C. players
Bathgate F.C. players
Scottish Football League players
Scottish Junior Football Association players